Kocaköy is a small village in Tarsus district of Mersin Province, Turkey. Although its name mean "big village" actually it is one of the least populous settlements in Tarsus district with a population of only 46. as of 2012.

References

Villages in Tarsus District